Chetochelacarus is a monotypic genus of mites belonging to the monotypic family Chetochelacaridae. The only species is Chetochelacarus mamillatus.

References 

Sarcoptiformes
Acari genera
Monotypic arachnid genera